Pla nuea on (tender-fleshed fish) may refer to:
A generic name for certain catfish fish species in Thailand
Kryptopterus cryptopterus (Blue sheatfish) 
Ompok bimaculatus (Butter catfish)
Phalacronotus apogon (Metallic sheatfish)
Phalacronotus bleekeri